Osman Ertuğrul Çetin (born 21 April 2003) is a Turkish association footballer who plays as a goalkeeper for Süper Lig club Fenerbahçe.

Career
Çetin started his career at Fenerbahçe, in 2014. In October 2020, Çetin moved to Altınordu. He never appeared in a competitive match for Altınordu. In January 2021, Çetin moved back to Fenerbahçe. He made his professional debut with Fenerbahçe in a 1–1 Süper Lig draw against Antalyaspor on 15 January 2022, at the age of 18.

Career statistics

References

External links
 
 
 

2003 births
Living people
Footballers from Istanbul
Fenerbahçe S.K. footballers
Süper Lig players
Association football goalkeepers
Turkish footballers
Altınordu F.K. players